The Northern short grasslands includes parts of the Canadian provinces of Alberta and Saskatchewan, and the American Great Plains states of Montana, North Dakota, Wyoming, South Dakota and Nebraska. One of 867 terrestrial ecoregions defined by the World Wide Fund for Nature, the United States Environmental Protection Agency (EPA) further breaks this ecoregion into the Northwestern Glaciated Plains and Northwestern Great Plains.

Climate
The Northern short grasslands have a semi-arid climate, with annual average precipitation ranging from 270mm to 450mm .

Flora
Dominant grasses include blue grama, needlegrass and spear grass. Big sagebrush is common in the southwest of the region, but almost non-existent in the north, northeast and east, where silver sagebrush is very common. Prickly pear and yellow cactus can be found in drier areas, especially in the badlands areas that can be found across the ecoregion. In the wettest areas, along water bodies, plains cottonwood, trembling aspen, willows and other trees can be found, along with various aquatic plants.

Fauna
The Northern Short Grasslands were once home to vast herds of bison, and some can still be found in places such as Grasslands National Park in southwestern Saskatchewan, and on private ranches. Pronghorn can be found in great numbers in much of the region, benefiting greatly from conservation measures. Mule deer are very common, and white-tailed deer somewhat less so. Despite various intense pest control measures, immense colonies of Richardson's ground squirrels still remain, though the black-tailed prairie dog is much less common than before European settlement. The steppe here was once home to elk and grizzly bears, but these species have been extirpated from the plains.

See also
Shortgrass prairie
List of ecoregions in Canada (WWF)
List of ecoregions in the United States (WWF)
Palliser's Triangle, which includes the Canadian portion of this ecoregion

References

External links

Vanderbilt University - Northern short grasslands

 Northern short
Ecoregions of Canada
Ecozones and ecoregions of Alberta
Geographic regions of Saskatchewan
Grasslands of Canada